Austad Church is a parish church of the Church of Norway in Bygland Municipality in Agder county, Norway. It is located in the village of Tveit on the south shore of the river Otra, just off the Norwegian National Road 9. It is one of the churches for the Bygland og Årdal parish which is part of the Otredal prosti (deanery) in the Diocese of Agder og Telemark. The white, wooden church was built in a long church design in 1880 using plans drawn up by the architect Oskar Fabricius who was from Kristiania. The church seats about 250 people.

History
The earliest existing historical records of the church date back to the year 1328, but it was likely built around the year 1200. After the Black Death, the church was without its own priest for many years (around 1350-1400). After that, it was an annex to the Bygland Church. In 1668, the old stave church was torn down and a small log church was built in its place on the same site.

In 1872, the old church was in very poor condition, so the parish began to look into its options. In 1878, the parish received permission to tear down and replace the old building. The new church was consecrated on 7 July 1880 by the Bishop Jørgen Moe.

Media gallery

See also
List of churches in Agder og Telemark

References

Bygland
Churches in Agder
Wooden churches in Norway
19th-century Church of Norway church buildings
Churches completed in 1880
13th-century establishments in Norway